The 2004–05 season was the 91st season in the existence of Stade Malherbe Caen and the club's first season back in the top flight of French football. In addition to the domestic league, Caen participated in this season's edition of the Coupe de France and the Coupe de la Ligue. The season covered the period from 1 July 2004 to 30 June 2005.

Transfers

In

Out

Pre-season and friendlies

Competitions

Overall record

Ligue 1

League table

Results summary

Results by round

Matches

Coupe de France

Coupe de la Ligue

Statistics

Goalscorers

References

Stade Malherbe Caen seasons
Caen